The Eyalet of Rumeli, or Eyalet of Rumelia, known as the Beylerbeylik of Rumeli until 1591, was a first-level province (beylerbeylik or eyalet) of the Ottoman Empire encompassing most of the Balkans ("Rumelia"). For most of its history, it was the largest and most important province of the Empire, containing key cities such as Edirne, Yanina (Ioannina), Sofia, Filibe (Plovdiv), Manastır/Monastir (Bitola), Üsküp (Skopje), and the major seaport of Selanik/Salonica (Thessaloniki). It was also among the oldest Ottoman eyalets, lasting more than 500 years with several territorial restructurings over the long course of its existence.

The capital was in Adrianople (Edirne), Sofia, and finally Monastir (Bitola).

History 
The first beylerbey of Rumelia was Lala Shahin Pasha, who was awarded the title by Sultan Murad I as a reward for his capture of Adrianople (Edirne) in the 1360s, and given military authority over the Ottoman territories in Europe, which he governed effectively as the Sultan's deputy while the Sultan returned to Anatolia. Also, Silistra Eyalet was formed in 1593.

From its foundation, the province of Rumelia—initially termed beylerbeylik or generically vilayet ("province"), only after 1591 was the term eyalet used—encompassed the entirety of the Ottoman Empire's European possessions, including the trans-Danubian conquests like Akkerman, until the creation of further eyalets in the 16th century, beginning with the Archipelago (1533), Budin (1541) and Bosnia (1580).

The first capital of Rumelia was probably Edirne (Adrianople), which was also, until the Fall of Constantinople in 1453, the Ottomans' capital city. It was followed by Sofia for a while and again by Edirne until 1520, when Sofia once more became the seat of the beylerbey. At the time, the beylerbey of Rumelia was the commander of the most important military force in the state in the form of the timariot sipahi cavalry, and his presence in the capital during this period made him a regular member of the Imperial Council (divan). For the same reason, powerful Grand Viziers like Mahmud Pasha Angelovic or Pargalı Ibrahim Pasha held the beylerbeylik in tandem with the grand vizierate.

In the 18th century, Monastir emerged as an alternate residence of the governor, and in 1836, it officially became the capital of the eyalet. At about the same time, the Tanzimat reforms, aimed at modernizing the Empire, split off the new eyalets of Üsküb, Yanya and Selanik and reduced the Rumelia Eyalet to a few provinces around Monastir. The rump eyalet survived until 1867, when, as part of the transition to the more uniform vilayet system, it became part of the Salonica Vilayet.

Governors
The governor of the Rumelia Eyalet was titled "Beylerbey of Rumelia" (Rumeli beylerbeyi) or "Vali of Rumelia" (Rumeli vali).

Administrative divisions

1475
A list dated to 1475 lists seventeen subordinate sanjakbeys, who controlled sub-provinces or sanjaks, which also functioned as military commands:

 Constantinople
 Gallipoli
 Edirne
 Nikebolu/Nigbolu
 Vidin
 Sofia
 Serbia (Laz-ili)
 Serbia (Despot-ili)
 Vardar (under the Evrenosoğullari)
 Üsküb
 Arnavut-ili (under Iskender Bey, i.e. Skanderbeg)
 Arnavut-ili (under the Arianiti family)
 Bosnia
 Bosnia (under Stephen)
 Arta, Zituni and Athens
 Morea
 Monastir

1520s
Another list, dating to the early reign of Suleiman the Magnificent (r. 1520–1566), lists the sanjakbeys of that period, in approximate order of importance.:

 Bey of the Pasha-sanjak
 Bosnia
 Morea
 Semendire
 Vidin
 Hersek
 Silistre
 Ohri
 Avlonya
 Iskenderiyye
 Yanya
 Gelibolu
 Köstendil
 Nikebolu
 Sofia
 Inebahti
 Tirhala
 Alaca Hișar
 Vulcetrin
 Kefe
 Prizren
 Karli-eli
 Ağriboz
 Çirmen
 Vize
 Izvornik
 Florina
 Elbasan
 Sanjakbey of the Çingene ("Gypsies")
 Midilli
 Karadağ (Montenegro)
 Sanjakbey of the Müselleman-i Kirk Kilise ("Muslims of Kirk Kilise")
 Sanjakbey of the Voynuks

The Çingene, Müselleman-i Kirk Kilise and Voynuks were not territorial circumscriptions, but rather represented merely a sanjakbey appointed to control these scattered and often nomadic groups, and who acted as the commander of the military forces recruited among them. The Pasha-sanjak in this period comprised a wide area in western Macedonia, including the towns of Üskub (Skopje), Pirlipe (Prilep), Manastir (Bitola) and Kesriye (Kastoria).

A similar list compiled c. 1534 gives the same sanjaks, except for the absence of Sofia, Florina and Inebahti (among the provinces transferred to the new Archipelago Eyalet in 1533), and the addition of Selanik (Salonica).

1538 
In 1538 there are listed 29 liva (sanjaks) during the reign of Sultan Suleiman I.

 Sofya (Pasha Sanjak of Rumelia)
 Ağrıboz
 Alacahisar
 Avlonya
 Bosna
 Çirmen
 Gelibolu
 Hersek
 İlbasan
 İskenderiye
 İzvornik
 Karlıili
 Kefe
 Köstendil
 Mora
 Niğbolu
 Ohri
 Prizrin
 Rodos
 Semendire
 Silistre
 Tırhala
 Vidin
 Vize
 Vulçıtrın
 Yanya
 Müselleman-ı Kızılca
 Müselleman-ı Çingane
 Voynugan-ı Istabl-ı Amire

1644 
Further sanjaks were removed with the progressive creation of new eyalets, and an official register c. 1644 records only fifteen sanjaks for the Rumelia Eyalet:

 Köstendil
 Tirhala
 Prizren
 Yanya
 Delvine
 Vulcetrin
 Üskub
 Elbasan
 Avlonya
 Dukagin
 Iskenderiyye
 Ohri
 Alaca Hișar
 Selanik
 Voynuks

1700/1730

The administrative division of the beylerbeylik of Rumelia between 1700-1730 was as follows:

 Pasha-sanjak, around Manastir
 Köstendil
 Tirhala
 Yanya
 Delvina
 Elbasan
 Iskenderiyye
 Avlonya
 Ohri
 Alaca Hisar
 Selanik
 Dukagin
 Prizren
 Üsküb
 Vulçıtrin
 Voynuks
 Çingene
 Yoruks

Early 19th century 
Sanjaks in the early 19th century:

 Manastir
 Selanik
 Tirhala
 Iskenderiyye
 Ohri
 Avlonya
 Köstendil
 Elbasan
 Prizren
 Dukagin
 Üsküb
 Delvina
 Vulcetrin
 Kavala
 Alaca Hișar
 Yanya
Smederevo

Mid-19th century 

According to the state yearbook (salname) of the year 1847, the reduced Rumelia Eyalet, centred at Manastir, encompassed also the sanjaks of Iskenderiyye (Scutari), Ohri (Ohrid) and Kesrye (Kastoria). In 1855, according to the French traveller A. Viquesnel, it comprised the sanjaks of Iskenderiyye, with 7 kazas or sub-provinces, Ohri with 8 kazas, Kesrye with 8 kazas and the pasha-sanjak of Manastir with 11 kazas.

References

Bibliography 
 
 
 
 
 

Eyalets of the Ottoman Empire in Europe
History of the Balkans

States and territories established in the 1360s
States and territories disestablished in 1867
1360s establishments in the Ottoman Empire
1867 disestablishments in the Ottoman Empire